Milícia Catalana (lit. Catalan militia) was a Spanish nationalist and ultra-catholic armed paramilitary group that operated between 1976 and the mid 90s in Catalonia. The emergence of this group is due to the parallel emergence in Spain of other violent right-wing groups that attacked the democratic opposition and the growing independentist and/or socialist movements. The political wing of Milícia Catalana was the Catalan Patriotic Movement (MPC).

The main objectives of this group were Catalan independence-related associations and independentist parties (especially the Moviment de Defensa de la Terra, the most prominent extra-parliamentary political expression of the Catalan independence movement); but Milícia Catalana also attacked clinics where abortions were practiced (in 1989, the Dexeus Clinic façade was damaged by an explosion attributed to the band.), LGBT locals and brothels Similarly, they sent threats and intimidated collectives of the alternative left and those who satirized with Catholicism, like Els Joglars, a popular theater company. One of its most famous attacks was the provocated fire near the Sanctuary of Montserrat in August 1986, burning 2,000 hectares, the 75% of the mountain area, and leaving 1,000 people isolated in the sanctuary for a day.

The group had some relations with the Spanish police, denouncing independentist groups a phenomenon of collusion with the police and the Guardia Civil. This was confirmed by the death of a policeman, and Milícia Catalana militant, while manipulating an explosive in 1989, the fact that the police gave Milícia Catalana information about the independentist movement and was confirmed by the leader of the group in 1989

See also
 Catalan Patriotic Movement
 Terra Lliure

References

20th century in Spain
Terrorism in Spain
Spanish nationalism
Far-right politics in Catalonia